The 1960–61 Segunda División season was the 30th since its establishment and was played between 10 September 1960 and 30 April 1961.

Overview before the season
32 teams joined the league, including two relegated from the 1959–60 La Liga and 6 promoted from the 1959–60 Tercera División.

Relegated from La Liga
Las Palmas
Osasuna

Promoted from Tercera División

Pontevedra
San Sebastián
Hércules
Málaga
Castellón
Salamanca

Group North

Teams

League table

Top goalscorers

Top goalkeepers

Results

Group South

Teams

League table

Top goalscorers

Top goalkeepers

Results

Promotion playoffs

First leg

Second leg

Relegation playoffs

First leg

Second leg

External links
BDFútbol

Segunda División seasons
2
Spain